The Cottage may refer to:

 The Cottage (video game), a 1978 text-adventure game
 The Cottage (film), a 2008 horror film
 The Cottage (2006 film), a 2006 Japanese drama film
 The Cottage (2012 film), a 2012 film starring Bellamy Young
 The Cottage (Upper Marlboro, Maryland), listed on the NRHP in Maryland
 The Cottage (short story), a short story by Frank Belknap Long
 Craven Cottage, the football stadium of Fulham F.C. in London, often referred to as "The Cottage"
 22 Bayley Lane, a grade II* listed building in Coventry